Chromatic Palette is an album by American jazz guitarist Tal Farlow, released in 1981.

Track listing 
 "All Alone" (Irving Berlin) – 4:09  
 "Nuages" (Django Reinhardt) – 5:53  
 "I Hear a Rhapsody" (George Fragos, Jack Baker, Dick Gasparre) – 3:19  
 "If I Were a Bell" (Frank Loesser) – 4:48  
 "St. Thomas" (Sonny Rollins) – 4:14  
 "Blue Art, Too" (Tal Farlow) – 5:16  
 "Stella by Starlight" (Victor Young, Ned Washington) – 4:27  
 "One for My Baby (and One More for the Road)" (Harold Arlen, Johnny Mercer) – 5:28

Personnel 
 Tal Farlow – guitar
 Tommy Flanagan – piano
 Gary Mazzaroppi – bass

References 

Tal Farlow albums
1981 albums